Sajjan Singh Rangroot is a 2018 Indian Punjabi-language war drama film directed by Pankaj Batra. It stars Diljit Dosanjh, Yograj Singh and Sunanda Sharma. The movie is based on a true story about the experiences of Sikh soldiers of the British Indian Army fighting on the Western Front during World War I. The movie was released on 23 March 2018 to coincide with the death anniversary of Bhagat Singh. On release, the film got positive reviews from both critics and audience. The movie is expected to be dubbed into Hindi by Cinekorn Entertainment and English. Sajjan Singh Rangroot is eighth highest grossing Punjabi film of all time and third highest-grossing film of 2018.

On 22 June 2018, Sajjan Singh Rangroot's exclusive internet rights were acquired by SHAREit

Plot 
In the present, many Sikh volunteers come to the Syria-Iraq border to help out refugees. An elderly Sikh volunteer tells his volunteers (especially a curious girl) about Sajjan Singh Rangroot, a soldier who fought in World War I.

In the early 20th century, Sajjan was a young Sikh man who disliked the British. Sajjan's father worked for the British. Sajjan's father wanted Sajjan to work for the British as well. As World War 1 was going on, Sajjan wanted to be a soldier for the British Indian army. He hoped that if the British won, India would gain independence. His father disliked the idea, but his mother was not against it. So Sajjan joins the army after an emotional farewell from his family. He becomes friends with many other soldiers like Dheera, Teja, Lacchman Das, and Mela Singh. Teja was an arrogant person, and Mela Singh was a person who lied a lot to get attention. Him lying leads to hilarious reactions. The Subedar (Leader) of the group was Zorawar Singh, who has fought many wars before. After rigorous training, the group reaches Britain to fight. The group were the Lahore Regiment.

When the regiment reaches Britain, many British soldiers make fun of the Sikhs. The soldiers train even more. At a tea shop, Sajjan and one British soldier try to have a fight, but the owner of the shop, who is called Becky, stops them as she does not want the tables and chairs to break. Sajjan then leaves the soldier alone. Becky then starts to like Sajjan. Sajjan finds out, but he is betrothed to someone called Jeeti.

The Sikhs and British find out that the Germans have invaded many British trenches. So the British and Sikhs have to get to a trench before the Germans attack. This is as the trench will protect them. During that, the Germans attack. However, the Sikhs and British get the trench and later capture the main German trench line, forcing the Germans to retreat. But Dheera dies during that. Sajjan becomes really disturbed, but Zorawar makes Sajjan better. The Germans find out that Sikhs are helping the British in the war. So, the Germans send them a letter. The letter says that the Sikhs should join the Germans as they will get better equipment, food, and more salary. Sajjan refuses as Sikhs should not be traitors.

After a month of staying in the trenches, Mela Singh tells Sajjan that it is Baisakhi. But the Baisakhi is a sad one. So Sajjan tries to make everyone happy by singing a song. After, the Germans attack the trench, and the Sikhs and the British escape. The Germans take over the trench. Teja dies during that. So Sajjan decides to go into the battlefield alone and bomb the trench. Sajjan is successful, and all Germans in the trench die. However, Sajjan dies as well.

In India, the British and the people pay their respects to Sajjan. In the present, the elderly Sikh volunteer shows the curious girl a photo of Zorawar (the volunteer's grandfather) and Sajjan. The Sikh volunteers now feel motivated to be like Sajjan Singh Rangroot.

Cast 
 Diljit Dosanjh as Sep. Sajjan Singh
 Yograj Singh as Sub. Zorawar Singh
 Darren Tassell Sgt. Mark Campbell
 Sunanda Sharma as Jeeti Kaur 
 Jagjeet Sandhu as Teja Singh
 Dheeraj Kumar as Dheera Singh
 Gunjyot Singh as Lachhman Daas
 Jarnail Singh as Mela Singh
 Mahabir Bhullar as Khalsa Aid
 Ravi Singh as CEO Khalsa Aid
 Alex Reece as Jack
 Peter Irving as Colonel George Smith
 Caroline Wilde as Becky
 Jaswant Daman as Jeeti's mother
 Deeraj Kumar as Deera Singh

Production 
Faversham Market in Kent was used in multiple scenes of the film, in which WWI soldiers are seen marching through the town.

Soundtrack
All the songs of the soundtrack album were composed by Jatinder Shah. The song Pyaas was composed by Uttam Singh.

Reception

Critical response 
Mike McCahill of The Guardian gave three stars out of five and concluded "Batra hits most of his big emotional beats, rightly sensing there might be something stirring and striking in the sight of beturbaned warriors charging across a field in Belgium". Jyoti Sharma Bawa of Hindustan Times gave two stars out of five, She said "Sajjan Singh Rangroot's main fault is that it tries to do much".

References

External links

Sajjan Singh Rangroot on Bollywood Hungama

2018 films
Films scored by Jatinder Shah
2018 war drama films
World War I films
2010s action war films
Western Front (World War I) films
Films set in the 1910s
Films set in the British Raj
Films set in France
Films set in the United Kingdom
Films set in Kent
Punjabi-language Indian films
2010s Punjabi-language films
Indian war drama films
Indian action war films
Films about Sikhism
Indian historical action films
Films shot in Kent
Films directed by Pankaj Batra
2018 drama films
2010s historical action films